Monopoly Exposure is a 2014 Chinese television series directed by Gao Xixi. It first aired in China on 25 December 2014.

Cast
 Ruby Lin as Fang Dan(方舟)
 Zhou Yiwei as Zhu Wu Yi(祝五一)
 Li Yi Xiao as Shen Hongye(沈红叶)
 Huo Qing as Yuan Xiao(萧原)
 Kou Zhen Hai as Fang Shou Dao(方守道)
 Zhu Lin as Zhu Jin Yu(祝槿玉)
 Yu Bin as Han Zhen Dong(韩振东)
 Fan Yu Lin as He Guang Lei(何光磊)
 Li Ji Chun as Cao Dawei(曹大伟)
 Li Jianyi as Zhou Ziheng(周自恒)

Production
Filming for the series started on 22 July 2010 and ended on 14 November 2010. Most scenes were shot in Wuxi, Jiangsu province as well as several locations in Beijing.

Featured songs
Qing Shi Huangfei (Gentle Waves)  
Composer: Liu Wei
Lyricist: Chen Lin
Performer: Sun Hao
Qing Shi Huangfei (Clouds are sailing)  
Composer: Liu Wei
Lyricist: Chen Lin
Performer: Sun Hao

References

External links
Sina official Page

Television shows set in Beijing
2014 Chinese television series debuts
2015 Chinese television series endings
Thriller television series
Chinese mystery television series